BRAVE Combat Federation is a mixed martial arts (MMA) promotion based in the Middle East. The organization was established on 23 September 2016 by Sheikh Khalid bin Hamad Al Khalifa. BRAVE Combat Federation features mixed martial artists from more than 40 nations located in five continents. BRAVE Combat Federation events are aired though multiple media partners including El Rey Network, Combate, Myx TV, S+A ESPN 5 and Bahrain Radio and Television Corporation. BRAVE Combat Federation produced six pay-per-view events apart from announcing events in Abu Dhabi and Brazil.

The organization was formally launched in 2016 and has established operations in Dublin, São Paulo and Mumbai prior to launching events and for talent relations. BRAVE Combat Federation, alongside the holding company, KHK MMA and Bahrain Mixed Martial Arts Federation hosted the IMMAF World Championships in November, 2017, a partnership which was renewed for 2018 and 2019

In July 2021, BRAVE Combat Federation was nominated for the first time as Promotion of the Year on the World MMA Awards.

It has a strategic partnership with fellow fight promoters Real Xtreme Fighting (RXF), a Romanian promotion.

History

KHK MMA
KHK MMA is a Bahrain based mixed martial arts organization which promotes the growth of mixed martial arts in the region. KHK MMA is also the holding company of BRAVE Combat Federation. KHK MMA was established by Sheikh Khalid bin Hamad Al Khalifa. Bahrain MMA is the official gym for KHK MMA. KHK MMA launched operations of BRAVE Combat federation on July 27, 2016, and officially launched the promotion on 23 September 2016. KHK MMA Fight Team features fighters from multiple promotions including Khabib Nurmagomedov, Frankie Edgar, Jose Torres and James Gallagher. Coaches and UFC Hall of Famers like Renzo Gracie, John Kavanagh, Bob Schirmer, and Pete Williams are also working with KHK MMA.

Launch of BRAVE Combat Federation

After establishing KHK MMA as a rising force within the MMA world, Sheikh Khalid bin Hamad Al Khalifa started working towards introducing a global event.

BRAVE Combat Federation was officially launched during a press conference held in the Kingdom of Bahrain on July 27, 2016. Less than two months later, Brave 1: The Beginning took place in Isa Town, Bahrain, on September 23, 2016, a date which coincided with Sheikh Khalid's birthday. BRAVE rounded up the first few months of its operations with BRAVE 2: Dynasty, also taking place in Bahrain

2017

Brazil 
After capturing the attention of the MENA region, with two shows in Bahrain, BRAVE CF took the step to further develop the brand in other regions, as well as strengthening Bahraini sports' position in the international scene. Brazil was chosen to be the first country to host a BRAVE event outside its homeland, with future Lightweight champions Lucas "Mineiro" Martins and Luan Santiago, as well as former Welterweight titleholder Carlston Harris among the fighters who made their promotional debuts at BRAVE 3: Battle in Brazil. The fight card was also the first appearance of former UFC champion and KHK MMA fighter Frankie Edgar as a color commentator

First World champion 
Continuing its trend of international fight nights, BRAVE Combat Federation made its debut in Abu Dhabi and crowned its first-ever world champion. French-Algerian submission specialist Elias Boudegzdame defeated Masio Fullen in the main event of BRAVE 4: Unstoppable and became the promotion's maiden Featherweight world champion.

The show also witnessed the promotional debut of Middle East superstar Mohammad Fakhreddine, who was scheduled to headline BRAVE 1: The Beginning before he suffered an injury. "The Latest" faced off against Brazil's Vinicius Cruz and won by TKO in the second round.

Trips to India, Kazakhstan, and Mexico 
After Brazil and the United Arab Emirates, BRAVE continued to travel around the world, as India, Kazakhstan, and Mexico were all treated to events between April and July.

BRAVE 5: Go For Glory took place in Mumbai, India, on April 22, and had an anticlimactic main event, as Carl Booth and Tahar Hadbi fought to a No Contest, due to a timekeeping error.

Brave 6: Kazakhstan happened a week later, in Almaty, where future Super Lightweight world champion Eldar Eldarov bested Brazilian Henrique Rasputin by TKO. It was also home to the first-ever BRAVE female fight, as Flyweight Mariya Agapova beat Yulia Litvinceva by TKO in the first round.

Finally, BRAVE 7 took place in Mexico, and future world title challenger Alejandro "Pato" Martinez came out victorious in a grudge match against Fabian Quintanar.

Two new World champions 
For BRAVE 8: The Rise of Champions, the promotion went back to Curitiba, Brazil, after its successful debut in March. It was the first time BRAVE put two different titles on the line, with Welterweights Carl Booth and Mohammad Fakhreddine initially scheduled to face off, as well as Light Heavyweights Klidson Abreu and Timo Feucht.

On the eve of weigh-ins, Fakhreddine was forced to pull out of the fight after feeling ill during the weight-cut process. He was substituted by Carlston Harris, who ended up surprising Booth and winning the title by decision.

In the main event, Klidson Abreu bested Timo Feucht and became the first Brazilian champion for BRAVE

Return to Bahrain with International Combat Week 
For the year's last event, BRAVE decided to create the first-ever International Combat Week, in partnership with the IMMAF. The agreement stated that the ICW would happen for, at least, the next three years, with a BRAVE show closing out the Amateur World Championships.

BRAVE 9: The Kingdom of Champions also crowned two new titleholders, at Lightweight and Bantamweight.

Ottman Azaitar beat Alejandro "Pato" Martínez in the main event to capture the Lightweight belt, while Stephen Loman knocked out Gurdarshan Mangat to become the first-ever Bantamweight champion.

Elias Boudegzdame was initially scheduled to defend his Featherweight title against Lucas "Mineiro" Martins, but the bout was called off after the challenger fell ill during the weight cut.

MMA legend and BRAVE ambassador Wanderlei Silva attended the event, as well as Frankie Edgar, who served as the color commentator for the broadcast.

2018

First title defense 

After not being able to defend his belt at BRAVE 9, Elias "Smile" Boudegzdame was scheduled to take on Jakub Kowalewicz in the main event of BRAVE 10, the first event of 2018, which also served as BRAVE's debut in Jordan.

Boudegzdame made history in the main event of BRAVE 10, as he successfully defended his Featherweight title with a fourth-round submission of Kowalewicz, in a night marked by a clean sweep of Jordanian fighters.

Return to Brazil and Indonesia debut 

In March 2018, the promotion returned for its third event in Brazil, this time in Belo Horizonte, for another title doubleheader. Lucas "Mineiro" Martins won the interim Lightweight belt in the main event, beating Luan "Miau" Santiago by TKO in the last seconds of their fight, while Klidson Abreu successfully defended his Light Heavyweight throne by submitting Matt Baker, who stood in for Kennedy Nzechukwu, forced to pull out due to injury.
 
In May, BRAVE continued to visit new destinations, this time traveling to Jakarta, Indonesia, for BRAVE 12: KHK Legacy.

In the main event, Eldar Eldarov continued his winning streak by outpointing Brian Hooi in the scorecards, going 3-0 for BRAVE CF.

Europe Evolution 
BRAVE's maiden trip to Europe took place at The SSE Arena, in Belfast, Northern Ireland, as the promotion organized BRAVE 13: Europe Evolution, on June 9, with 28 fighters from 15 nations in action.

In the main event, Bantamweight champion Stephen Loman beat Frans Mlambo, a training partner of Conor McGregor, in a rematch of their 2016 fight, back at Brave 1.

The UFC superstar was in attendance to watch Mlambo and his teammate Cian Cowley, who had a successful debut, stopping Daniel Olejniczak to score his first professional MMA victory.

African debut 
BRAVE Combat Federation became the first global MMA promotion to do a show in Africa, as the organization hosted BRAVE 14, in Tangier, Morocco, on August 18.

The event was hosted under the patronage of King Mohammed VI, the king of Morocco.

In the main event, then-Lightweight champion Ottman Azaitar moved up to Welterweight to face Danijel Kokora and came out victorious via first-round TKO.

A few weeks after his appearance at BRAVE 14, Azaitar was stripped of his Lightweight title for not defending it. The vacated belt would be contested later in the year, at BRAVE 18.

The show was also marked by the debuts of former UFC fighter Jeremy Kennedy, who beat Danyel Pilo in the co-main event, and future Welterweight world champion Abdoul Abdouraguimov, winner via TKO in the first round against Sidney Wheeler.

Furthermore, the Moroccan crowd witnessed BRAVE's fastest-ever KO, as Djamil Chan ended Alejandro "Pato" Martinez's night at 29 seconds of their bout.

New territories and return to Abu Dhabi 
After its first trip to Africa, BRAVE returned to South America, this time hosting its first-ever Colombia event. BRAVE 15 took place in Bucaramanga and featured former UFC standout Godofredo Pepey taking on local star Alex "Rolo" Torres in the main event, and other six Brazilian fighters scheduled to take on other Latin American athletes from Mexico, Argentina, Colombia and Peru, with a clean sweep for Brazil, including Pepey submitting Torres and debut victories for Featherweight Gabriel "Fly" Miranda and Welterweight Geraldo "Luan Santana" Neto

Sandwiched between two events in new territories (the other being BRAVE 17, in Pakistan) was the return of BRAVE to Abu Dhabi. The fight card for BRAVE 16 was topped by a title doubleheader as Carlston Harris (Welterweight) and Elias Boudegzdame (Featherweight) looked to defend their crowns in the two main fights.

However, they were both bested by Jarrah Al-Selawe and Bubba Jenkins, respectively, and two new champions were crowned.

As in other countries, BRAVE also became the first global event to host a fight night in Pakistan. BRAVE 17 took place in Lahore and saw the emergence of Abdoul Abdouraguimov as a title contender, with the French-Russian submission specialist dominating veteran Rodrigo Cavalheiro en route to a unanimous decision victory

International Combat Week 2018 
The second edition of the International Combat Week, which culminated with BRAVE 18, was scheduled between November 12 and November 17, with the promotion's return to Bahrain coming on November 16.

BRAVE 18 was initially scheduled with three title fights, a first in company history. The Lightweight division would have a new champion after Ottman Azaitar's departure, Bantamweight kingpin Stephen Loman would look to defend his crown once again, while Velimurad Alkhasov and Marcel Adur would fight for the inaugural Flyweight crown

In the main event of the evening, Abdul-Kareem Al-Selwady stopped Lucas "Mineiro" Martins, then interim champion, and unified the Lightweight championship, which was vacated earlier in the year due to inactivity by Ottman Azaitar.

Bantamweight champion Stephen Loman became the first titleholder to defend his crown twice for BRAVE as he beat Brazil's Felipe Efrain by decision in the co-main event.

The Flyweight division remained without a champion, as Velimurad Alkhasov beat Marcel Adur via unanimous decision. Since the Russian powerhouse missed weight, the title would only be up for grabs in case of a win for Adur

The event was attended by a host of big names such as Khabib Nurmagomedov, Jose "Shorty" Torres, Lenne Hardt and Sean O'Malley (fighter)

Busiest month 
December 2018 was the busiest month in the promotion's short history. BRAVE organized three events in three different countries, with a total of 12 shows in 12 nations for 2018.

BRAVE 19 took place on December 8, in Sun City, South Africa, another country which hosted an international MMA show for the first time with BRAVE Combat Federation

In the main event, South African prospect Mark Hulme beat American veteran Adam Townsend by unanimous decision, in a violent bout, marked by a cut in Townsend's scalp, coming from an elbow from his opponent

Two weeks later, the promotion made its much-awaited return to India, this time in Hyderabad, where Sidney Wheeler was initially scheduled to take Leon Aliu in the main event. However, Aliu was forced to pull out due to injury and was replaced by Khamzat Chimaev.

The Swede continued his trend of first-round TKO's by ending Wheeler's night after only 35 seconds, despite having only nine days to prepare for his first main event with BRAVE.

Finally, the year was closed out by another debut country, with Saudi Arabia also having its first taste of international MMA with BRAVE 21, which was held in Jeddah, on December 28.

Jeremy Kennedy continued his string of finishes under BRAVE as he overwhelmed rising star Marat Magomedov en route to a third-round TKO, in a bout that served as the main event

2019

Debut in the Philippines 
With the success of Bantamweight champion Stephen Loman, BRAVE announced in November 2018 it would make its debut in the Philippines in 2019. After weeks of speculation, BRAVE 22 was announced for March 15, at the Mall of Asia Arena.

The show featured the third title defense of Loman's title, as he took on former Featherweight champion Elias Boudegzdame, dropping down to Bantamweight for the first time under BRAVE.

The show would initially feature the debut of amateur world champion Jose Torres, who would take on Amir Albazi in the co-main event.

However, the American fighter was forced to withdraw due to injury and the bout was moved to BRAVE 23.

In the main event, Loman maintained his undefeated Brave record with another dominant performance, knocking out Boudegzdame in the fourth round of their championship bout

Return to Jordan and Super Lightweight debut 
BRAVE 23: Pride and Honor took place on April 19, in Amman, Jordan, and the biggest story was the inauguration of the Super Lightweight division, with a title fight between Eldar Eldarov and Mounir Lazzez

Aside from that, BRAVE 23 also featured another two title fights, with the main event happening between Welterweight champion Jarrah Al-Selawe and challenger Abdoul Abdouraguimov. The bout was also the official start of the Welterweight division as a 175 lbs weight class

Finally, Lightweight world champion Abdul-Kareem Al-Selwady would look to defend his title against Luan "Miau" Santiago, who was fresh off a decision victory against Djamil Chan

In the main event, Abdouraguimov won a split decision to become the new Welterweight world champion in a very closely contested bout

Eldarov became the first-ever Super Lightweight champion with a decision victory over Mounir Lazzez, and Luan Santiago also knocked Abdul-Kareem Al-Selwady off his throne with a spinning elbow KO.

London extravaganza and South America tour 

On July 25, BRAVE Combat Federation made its much-anticipated debut in London. With a seven-fight card in an invite-only show with hundreds of influencers, celebrities, and politicians. In the main event, Bubba Jenkins successfully defended his Featherweight title against Brazil's Lucas Mineiro.

A little more than a month later, BRAVE made its annual trip to Brazil, once again hosting an event in Belo Horizonte. In the main event, newly crowned Lightweight world champion Luan Santiago ended up submitted in the first seconds of his bout against Cleiton Silva, who became the fifth BRAVE CF Lightweight titleholder.

A week later, BRAVE returned to Colombia, when former UFC fighter Felipe Silva made his promotional debut. Silva scored a TKO victory over Dumar Roa, while Luana Pinheiro became the first woman with two BRAVE CF wins, by submitting Yasmeli Araque also in the first round of BRAVE 26.

KHK World Championships 

After successful events in Abu Dhabi and Romania, BRAVE Combat Federation turned its attention to its biggest show ever, which took place on November 15 in Isa Town, Bahrain. BRAVE CF 29 crowned the first-ever KHK World Champion, in a one-night, four-men, openweight tournament, that included Brazilians Guto Inocente and Kleber Orgulho, as well as Russian powerhouse Azamat Murzakanov and Lebanon superstar Mohammad Fakhreddine.

After two fights in one night, Azamat Murzakanov came out victorious. He took home US$100,000, and also became the provisional holder of the KHK belt, weighing 6,2 kg of gold.

Return to India

BRAVE Combat Federation returned to India for BRAVE CF 30 on November 23, 2019. The event was headlined by the Bantamweight title fight between champion Stephen Loman and Louie Sanoudakis. The card also had a strong presence of Indian fighters as well. Stephen Loman retained the title with a unanimous decision victory in the main event.

Roster

Rules
BRAVE Combat Federation follows the Unified Rules of Mixed Martial Arts that were originally established by the New Jersey State Athletic Control Board and modified by the Nevada State Athletic Commission.

After the Association of Boxing Commissions approved the opening of new weight classes, BRAVE announced it would become the first international promotion to introduce a Super Lightweight division, as well as pushing the Welterweight limit to 175 lbs.

Weight divisions and champions

BRAVE Combat Federation has following weight classes:

BRAVE Combat Federation Title history

BRAVE Combat Federation Light Heavyweight Championship
186 to 205 lbs (84.3 to 93 kg)

BRAVE Combat Federation Middleweight Championship
176 to 185 lbs (79.8 to 83.9 kg)

BRAVE Combat Federation Welterweight Championship
166 to 175 lbs (75.3 kg to 79.4 kg)

BRAVE Combat Federation Super Lightweight Championship
156 to 165 lbs (70.8 kg to 74.9 kg)

BRAVE Combat Federation Lightweight Championship
146 to 155 lbs (66.2 to 70.3 kg)

BRAVE Combat Federation Featherweight Championship
136 to 145 lbs (61.7 to 65.8 kg)

BRAVE Combat Federation Bantamweight Championship
126 to 135 lbs (57.1 to 61.2 kg)

Events
BRAVE Combat Federation has held events in 19 countries during its three-plus years of operations. BRAVE has been to Bahrain, Brazil, the United Arab Emirates, India, Kazakhstan, Mexico, Jordan, Indonesia, Northern Ireland, Morocco, Colombia, Pakistan, South Africa, Saudi Arabia, the Philippines, England, Romania, Kyrgyzstan, Slovenia, and will make its Sweden debut soon. Due to the COVID-19 pandemic, the promotion has announced that the upcoming three shows will be postponed until a later date.

On July 20, BRAVE CF returned with BRAVE CF 35 taking place in Romania. A week later, the organization hosted another show in Romania, and then moved on to Sweden for four straight events.

After BRAVE CF 40, the organization announced plans for three straight shows in Bahrain.

Following the tremendous success of the Kombat Kingdom series, BRAVE CF announced two further shows in Bahrain. BRAVE CF 44 took place on November 5, while BRAVE CF 45, scheduled for the following week, was postponed to November 19, due to the passing of the Bahrain Prime Minister. In early November, BRAVE CF announces its first show in Russia will take place in January 2021. After a successful BRAVE CF 46, the organization announced a series of four events, culminating in BRAVE CF 50, on April 1.

The expansion of BRAVE has been a wish of president Mohammed "The Hawk" Shahid, who claimed the idea behind going to different continents is to provide athletes with a truly global platform so they can showcase their talents, give opportunities to local fighters to shine in the international stage, as well as show that BRAVE is "the fastest-growing promotion in the world"

Scheduled events

Past events

BRAVE Combat Federation records

Broadcast

TV partners
 Bahrain Radio and Television Corporation
 OSN Sports
 El Rey Network
 Abu Dhabi Sports
 Combate
 Myx TV
 S+A
 ESPN 5
 MTV India
 Fite TV
 Polsat Sport

BRAVE TV

BRAVE Combat Federation announced last year the creation of BRAVE TV, an online subscription service in which fans would be able to watch live events, as well as reruns of old shows. BRAVE 23 was available on the newly formed online streaming platform to fans from all over the world, except for those territories contemplated with preexisting TV deals.

Talents
 Cyrus Fees: Play-by-play commentator
 Frankie Edgar: Color Commentator
 Nate Quarry: Color Commentator
 Alex Soto: Color Commentator
 Phil Campbell: Color Commentator
 Carlos Kremer: Cage announcer
 Cris Cyborg: Guest commentator
 Noel O'Keefe
 Kirik Jenness

Film production

SMILE - Documentary

BRAVE Combat Federation has announced initiation of operations of their subsidiary film production unit named BRAVE Films. To commence operations the film production unit produced the television documentary-drama "SMILE" on 26 June during Eid. The documentary narrates the story of the featherweight champion of BRAVE Combat Federation and behind the scenes of his training leading to the championship bout. The content was shot extensively in Montpellier, France and Tijuana, Mexico apart from locations in Bahrain and in Abu Dhabi, United Arab Emirates. The initiative was publicised to popularise mixed martial arts and to showcase the lifestyle of fighters and marks the launch of "BRAVE Films", a film production segment by BRAVE Combat Federation.

BRAVE International Combat Week
In February 2017, KHK MMA and IMMAF announced, during a press conference, a partnership which would see the Amateur World Championships move from Las Vegas to Bahrain for the first time.

IMMAF president Kerrith Brown was present at the official announcement, in which Bahrain MMA Association president Khalid Abdulaziz Al Khayyat praised Sheikh Khalid bin Hamad Al Khalifa's commitment to creating a culture for mixed martial arts in the region and claimed this shift as a deal closer for the world championships to move to Bahrain.

In addition to the world championships, BRAVE president Mohammed "The Hawk" Shahid announced in the same press conference that the promotion would host a show in the same week as the World Championships, saying it would be "one of the biggest fight weeks we've seen in Middle East combat sports history", which was named International Combat Week

2017
Organized under the patronage of His Highness Sheikh Nasser bin Hamad Al Khalifa, the first International Combat Week was held from November 12 to November 19, with BRAVE 9 taking place on November 17, featuring two title fights.

2018
In March 2018, IMMAF president Kerrith Brown officially announced the return of the Amateur World Championships to Bahrain for 2018 and 2019.

The 2018 International Combat Week took place between November 11 and November 18, with BRAVE 18 taking place on November 16.

BRAVE 18 crowned a new Lightweight champion in Abdul-Kareem Al-Selwady, and Stephen Loman retained his Bantamweight title by defending it against Brazil's Felipe Efrain.

See also
List of current Brave CF fighters

Notes

References

Mixed martial arts organizations
Mixed martial arts television shows

Mixed martial arts in Asia
Martial arts in Bahrain